The Carson Roller Mill is a manufacturing facility in Carson, North Dakota that was built in 1913.  It was listed on the National Register of Historic Places (NRHP) in 1980.

According to its NRHP nomination, it "is the only known roller flour mill in North Dakota to remain essentially unaltered and to contain its original equipment."  It is evaluated to be "a rare and valuable example of industrial technology related to the commerce and industry of North Dakota's early settlement period."

References

Grinding mills on the National Register of Historic Places in North Dakota
Industrial buildings completed in 1913
Flour mills in the United States
1913 establishments in North Dakota
National Register of Historic Places in Grant County, North Dakota